The national flag of the United Kingdom is the Union Jack, also known as the Union Flag.

The design of the Union Jack dates back to the Act of Union 1801, which united the Kingdom of Great Britain and the Kingdom of Ireland (previously in personal union) to create the United Kingdom of Great Britain and Ireland. The flag consists of the red cross of Saint George (patron saint of England, which also represents Wales), edged in white, superimposed on the saltire of St Patrick (patron saint of Ireland), also edged in white, which are superimposed on the saltire of Saint Andrew (patron saint of Scotland). Wales is not represented in the Union Flag by Wales's patron saint, Saint David, because the flag was designed whilst Wales was part of the Kingdom of England.

The flag proportions on land and the war flag used by the British Army have the proportions 3:5. The flag's height-to-length proportions at sea are 1:2. 

The earlier flag of Great Britain was established in 1606 by a proclamation of King James VI and I of Scotland and England. The new flag of the United Kingdom was officially created by an Order in Council of 1801, with its blazon reading as follows:
No official standardised colours were specified, although the Flag Institute defines the red and royal blue colours as Pantone 186 C and Pantone 280 C, respectively.

Flying the flag

The Union Flag can be flown by any individual or organisation in Great Britain on any day of their choice. Legal regulations restrict the use of the Union Flag on Government buildings in Northern Ireland. Long-standing restrictions on Government use of the flag elsewhere were abolished in July 2007.

Upside-down
While the flag appears symmetric, the white lines above and below the diagonal red are different widths. On the side closer to the flagpole (or on the left when depicted on paper), the white lines above the diagonals are wider; on the side farther from the flagpole (or on the right when depicted on paper), the converse is true. Thus, no change will be apparent when rotating the flag 180 degrees, but if mirrored the flag will be upside-down.

Placing the flag upside down is considered lèse majesté and is offensive to some. However, it can be flown upside down as a distress signal. While this is rare, it was used by groups under siege during the Boer War and during campaigns in India in the late 18th century.

St Patrick's saltire
Because of the relative positions of the saltires of St Patrick and St Andrew, the UK flag is not symmetrical. The red saltire of St Patrick is offset such that it does not relegate the white saltire of St Andrew to a mere border. St Andrew's saltire has the higher position at the hoist side with St Patrick's saltire in the higher position on the opposite side.

Half-mast
The Union Flag is flown from Government buildings at half-mast in the following situations:
from the announcement of the death of the Sovereign  (an exception is made for Proclamation Day – the day the new Sovereign is proclaimed, when the Flag is flown at full mast from 11 am to sunset)
the day of the funeral of a member of the British Royal Family
the funeral of a foreign Head of State
the funeral of a former British Prime Minister

The Sovereign sometimes declares other days when the Union Flag is to fly at half-mast. Half-mast means the flag is flown two-thirds of the way up the flagpole with at least the height of the flag between the top of the flag and the top of the flagpole.

Flying from public buildings 
Until July 2007, the Union Flag was only flown on Government buildings on a limited number of special days each year. The choice of days was managed by the Department for Culture, Media and Sport (DCMS). Government buildings are those used by civil servants, the Crown, or the armed forces. They were not applicable to private citizens, corporations, or local authorities.

On 3 July 2007, the Justice Secretary Jack Straw laid a green paper before Parliament entitled The Governance of Britain. Alongside a range of proposed changes to the constitutional arrangements of the UK was a specific announcement that there would be consultation on whether the rules on flag-flying on Government buildings should be relaxed.

Two days later, Prime Minister Gordon Brown announced that with immediate effect the Union Flag would fly from the flag pole above the front entrance of 10 Downing Street on every day of the year. The intention was to increase feelings of British national identity. Other Government departments were asked to follow this lead, and all Government buildings in Whitehall did so.

James Purnell, Culture Secretary from June 2007 to January 2008 in Brown's administration, subsequently concurred with the abolition of the restrictions – pending consultation on longer term arrangements.

Flag days
The flag days directed by the DCMS include birthdays of members of the Royal Family, the wedding anniversary of the Monarch, Commonwealth Day, Accession Day, Coronation Day, The King's official birthday, Remembrance Sunday and (in the Greater London area) on the days of the State Opening and prorogation of Parliament.

Since 2022, the relevant days have been:

 9 January: the birthday of The Princess of Wales
 20 January: the birthday of The Duchess of Edinburgh
 19 February: the birthday of The Duke of York
 Second Sunday in March: Commonwealth Day
 10 March: the birthday of The Duke of Edinburgh
 9 April: the anniversary of the wedding of The King and The Queen consort.
 A Saturday in June: The King's Official Birthday
 21 June: the birthday of The Prince of Wales
 17 July: the birthday of The Queen consort
 15 August: the birthday of The Princess Royal
 8 September: the anniversary of The King's accession in 2022
 Second Sunday in November: Remembrance Sunday
 14 November: The King's birthday

In addition, the flag should be flown in the following areas on the specified days:
 Wales, 1 March: Saint David's Day
 Northern Ireland, 17 March: Saint Patrick's Day
 England, 23 April: Saint George's Day
 Scotland, 30 November: Saint Andrew's Day
 Greater London: the opening or proroguing of Parliament

Some non-central government bodies still continue to follow the flag days.

In Scotland, the Scottish Government has decreed that the Flag of Scotland ("the Saltire") will fly on all its buildings every day from 8 am until sunset, but there is no specific policy on flying the Union Flag and as such it is sometimes flown alongside the Saltire and sometimes omitted. An exception is made for "national days". On these days, the Saltire shall be lowered and replaced with the Union Flag. These are the same as the flag days noted above with the exception of:
 3 September: Merchant Navy Day
On Saint Andrew's Day, the Union Flag can only be flown if the building has more than one flagpole—the Saltire will not be lowered to make way for the Union Flag if there is only one flagpole.

Welsh representation 

In November 2007 the then culture minister Margaret Hodge said she would consider a redesign of the Union Flag to incorporate the Welsh dragon, during a debate in the House of Commons on the frequency with which the flag flies above public buildings. The issue was initially raised by Ian Lucas, another Labour MP, who complained that the flag introduced in 1606 following the accession of James VI of Scotland to the English throne as James I assumed the Welsh population as English under the bracket of England and Wales  (represented by the cross of St George) which he then combined with the saltire of St Andrew which represented the union of England and Scotland.  This principle continued in 1801 when the St Patrick cross was incorporated following the Union with Ireland Act 1800. Lucas claimed the identity of Wales had been suppressed ever since the Laws in Wales Acts 1535–1542. In the debate, Albert Owen MP said that "we in Wales do not feel part of the union flag because the dragon or the cross of St David is not on it." Conservative MP Stewart Jackson described the comments as "eccentric".

Northern Ireland
In Northern Ireland, the Union Flag is flown from buildings of the Northern Ireland Office as decreed by Regulations published in 2000. The Regulations were amended in 2002 to remove the requirement to fly the flag on the birthdays of Queen Elizabeth, the Queen Mother and Princess Margaret, Countess of Snowdon who both died that year. The current flag days are now the same as the United Kingdom government days noted above with the exception of the Duchess of Cornwall's birthday, which was only added to the UK flag days after her wedding to the Prince of Wales in 2005, and has not yet been extended to Northern Ireland.

The Police Service of Northern Ireland is the only body in the United Kingdom that is not permitted to fly the Union Flag, and is only permitted to fly its service flag or the Royal Standard in the event of a visit by the Sovereign.

Scottish independence 
As of 2013, numerous proposals were made about how the Union Flag might be altered to create a flag for the union of England, Wales and Northern Ireland after possible Scottish independence. The College of Arms stated that there would be no need to change the flag in those circumstances, and the existing flag could continue to be used if desired. Regarding the removal of Scottish heraldic features from the Union Flag, the Court of the Lord Lyon stated in 2012 that "[that] would be speculation at this stage, and we could only cross that bridge if we came to it."

Construction sheets

See also
 Commonwealth's flags
 Historical flags of the British Empire and the overseas territories
 List of United Kingdom flags – a list of flags used within the United Kingdom, the Crown Dependencies and the British overseas territories.
 List of English flags – a list of flags used within England
 List of Cornish flags – a list of flags used within Cornwall
 List of Northern Irish flags – a list of flags used within Northern Ireland
 List of Scottish flags – a list of flags used within Scotland
 List of Welsh flags – a list of flags used within Wales
 List of Irish flags – a list of flags used within the Republic of Ireland
 National colours of the United Kingdom
 Protectorate Jack

Notes

References

External links

 
 British Monarchy – Union Flag
 British Armed forces Grenadiers Colour 

 
United Kingdom
National symbols of the United Kingdom
Unionism in the United Kingdom
United Kingdom
United Kingdom